Eläkeläiset (Finnish for "pensioners") are a Finnish humppa band founded in 1993. They specialise in humppa and jenkka music and have been successful in Germany, Finland and elsewhere.

Current members of the band are Onni Waris (keyboard, vocals), Petteri Halonen (keyboard, guitar, vocals), Lassi Kinnunen (accordion, vocals), Martti Waris (bass, vocals), and Tapio Santaharju (drums, vocals). Ilmari Koivuluhta (sound technique, logistics) and Pekka Jokinen (graphics, merchandise) complete the "humppa family". According to the band's statements, they play between 80 and 100 concerts per year, of which only 20 in Finland and 40 to 50 in Germany, due to their popularity there. Rarely performing in big venues, they have visited several big international music festivals, and surprisingly to many, even large heavy metal festivals e.g.  Wacken Open Air and Tuska Open Air. They travel mostly on a private lorry and no bus.

Eläkeläiset mainly play cover versions of famous pop and rock hits in a fast humppa or slow jenkka style (both sound somewhat similar to  polka music the way "Weird Al" Yankovic plays it) with Finnish lyrics — the original songs are barely recognizable. They also publish bootleg recordings of their own concerts.

Eläkeläiset are very popular among some OpenBSD developers and frequently played at their hackathons, where they claim they are "thwarting evil with humppa and math."

Eläkeläiset was one of the nominees to represent Finland in Eurovision Song Contest 2010.

Discography 
 Joulumanteli (1994, published only as a tape)
 Humppakäräjät (1994, album)
 Humppalöyly (1995, EP)
 Pyjamahumppa (1995, single)
 Humpan Kuninkaan Hovissa (1995, album)
 In Humppa We Trust (1996, live album)
 Dementikon Keppihumppa / Take Me To The City (1997, single)
 Humppamaratooni (1997, album) - its title track is a humppa arrangement of Whiskey in the Jar.
 Sensational Monsters Of Humppa (1998, single)
 Humppaorgiat (1999, EP with censored songs)
 Werbung, Baby! (1999, album)
 Huipputähtien Ykköshitit (1999, single)
 Humpan Kuninkaan Hovissa (2000, album, re-release incl. additional songs)
 Ja Humppa Soi (2000, single)
 Humppa-Akatemia (2000, double album)
 Humppa Till We Die (2000, CD)
 Humppa! (2001, compilation)
 Jenkkapolkkahumppa (2001, EP)
 Joulutorttu (2002, EP)
 Pahvische (2002, album)
 Katkolla Humppa (2003, EP)
 Keväthumppa (2003, EP)
 Humppaelämää (2003, album)
 Jukolan Humppa (2005, single)
 Humppasirkus (2006, album)
 Das Humppawerk (2006, EP)
 Humppakonsertto (2007, live album)
 Humppa United (2008, album)
 Humppabingo (2009, 2CD, compilation)
 Humpan Kuninkaan Hovissa (2010, album, re-release incl. bonus tracks)
 Humppasheikkailu (2012, album)
 Humppakalmisto (2013, album)
 Humppa of Finland (2017, album)
 Humppainfarkt (2018, EP)

See also
Mambo Kurt

References

External links

Official Homepage
Russian Eläkeläiset fanclub
Eläkeläiset history
Eläkeläiset covers, a list of which band and song each track on the album parodies.
Eläkeläiset covers, a list of the albums by Eläkeläiset, each album page shows the covers and the originals.

Finnish musical groups
Finnish comedy musicians
Finnish parodists
Parody musicians
Musical groups established in 1993
1993 establishments in Finland